Bussoleno is a comune (municipality) in the Metropolitan City of Turin in the Italian region Piedmont, located about  west of Turin.

Bussoleno borders the following municipalities: Usseglio, Mompantero, Chianocco, Susa, San Giorio di Susa, Mattie, Roure.

References

External links
 Official website